Oakwood Mall is an enclosed shopping mall in Eau Claire, Wisconsin. The anchor stores are HOM Furniture, JCPenney, Hobby Lobby, and Scheels All Sports.  There are 2 vacant anchor stores that were once Sears and AMC Theatres.

History
The mall opened on October 15, 1986.

It was renovated in 1996.

In 2002, Younkers opened in the mall, in a space formerly occupied by Target.

An addition to the theater was made in 1997.

In 2017, Carmike Cinemas was re-branded as AMC.

In March 2017, the Macy's store, which opened as Dayton's in 1991 and later became Marshall Fields in 2001, was closed.

On August 13, 2018, Hobby Lobby opened in the space formerly occupied by Macy's.

On August 27, 2018, Younkers closed when its parent company, The Bon-Ton Stores, was liquidated.

The Sears store closed on November 25, 2018.

HOM Furniture purchased the empty Younker's anchor for $2 million in January, 2019.

HOM furniture plans to move into the anchor in early 2020 in July, 2019.

KKMBA Eau Claire LLC began renovating the HOM furniture storefront in November, 2019.

The AMC theater permanently closed on October 3, 2022.

References

External links
Oakwood Mall official website

Brookfield Properties
Buildings and structures in Eau Claire, Wisconsin
Shopping malls in Wisconsin
Tourist attractions in Eau Claire County, Wisconsin
Shopping malls established in 1986